2017 Thai League 4 Western Region is the 5th season of the League competition since its establishment in 2013. It is in the 4th tier of the Thai football league system.

Changes from last season

Promoted clubs

Four club was promoted to the 2017 Thai League 3 Southern Region.
 Samut Sakhon
 Krung Thonburi
 Ratchaphruek University
 Simork

Relegated clubs

 Thonburi City were relegated to the 2016 Thai Division 3 Tournament Central Region with were collapsed Thonburi University.

Relocated clubs

 Look Isan and Pathum Thani United  were moved from the Bangkok & Eastern 2016.
 Chumphon were moved to the 2017 Thai League 4 Southern Region.

Expansion clubs

 BTU United was promoted to the 2017 Thai League 3 but this Club-licensing football club didn't pass to play 2017 Thai League 3. This team is relegated to 2017 Thai League 4 Western Region again.

Reserving clubs

 Ratchaburi B is Ratchaburi Reserving this team which join Northern Region first time.
 Suphanburi B is Suphanburi Reserving this team which join Northern Region first time.

Teams

Stadium and locations

League table

Results 1st and 2nd match for each team

Results 3rd match for each team
In the third leg, the winner on head-to-head result of the first and the second leg will be home team. If head-to-head result are tie, must to find the home team from head-to-head goals different. If all of head-to-head still tie, must to find the home team from penalty kickoff on the end of each second leg match (This penalty kickoff don't bring to calculate points on league table, it's only the process to find the home team on third leg).

Season statistics

Top scorers
As of 9 September 2017.

Attendance

See also
 2017 Thai League
 2017 Thai League 2
 2017 Thai League 3
 2017 Thai League 4
 2017 Thailand Amateur League
 2017 Thai FA Cup
 2017 Thai League Cup
 2017 Thailand Champions Cup

References

External links
 Thai League 4
 http://fathailand.org/news/97
 http://www.thailandsusu.com/webboard/index.php?topic=379167.0

4